Aymeric Eugène Robert d’Humières (2 March 1868 – 26 April 1915) was a French man of letters, poet, chronicler, translator and theatre director.

Biography 
Robert d'Humières was born on 2 March 1868 at the Château de Conros, Arpajon-sur-Cère in  Cantal département. A former pupil of Saint-Cyr, he returned to civilian life. Called up for the duration of the First World War as captain with the 4e régiment de zouaves, he was killed on 26 April 1915 at Lizerne. (in the defence of Ypres). He was cited in army orders as être mort en héros en combattant à la tête de son unité ("died heroically in combat at the head of his unit"). He was posthumously awarded the title of Chevalier de la Légion d'honneur.

He was the son of Count Aymeric d'Humières (1839–1923) and the Countess, née Norah Kelly, an American of Irish origin, born in Connecticut (1842–1922), the daughter of Robert Kelly. In 1905, he married Marie de Dampierre (1881–1917); they had three children.

A friend of Marcel Proust, he helped the latter with his translation of John Ruskin's The Bible of Amiens.

He was friend of Oscar Wilde who gives him a dedicated copy of his Poems (Paris, collection Jean-David Jumeau-Lafond).

Career 
If the name of Robert d'Humières is still known today, it is thanks to his friendship with Proust and also because of the beautiful translations he made (in collaboration with Louis Fabulet) of the works of Rudyard Kipling.

He was also an author whose personal genius, humanism, culture, scientific curiosity and first class poetic inspiration, clearly illustrate French literature. His penetrating, sometimes prophetic and always highly enlightened reflection, place him amongst the most inspired philosophers.

He was made director of the théâtre des Arts, from 1907 to 1909. He presented his silent drama The Tragedy of Salome with the American dancer Loie Fuller in his first season; Diaghilev reused this poem for his ballet 1913.

Works 
D'Humières developed an aesthetic of high and enlightened thoughts that is expressed in a dazzling form, sometimes mixing poetry and science. His epistolary novel, Lettres volées (1911), is of no less value than Les Liaisons dangereuses.

1894 La Belle au Bois Dormant, dramatic fairy tale in three acts written in collaboration with Henry Bataille and premiered on 24 May 1894.
1895 Les Temps nouveaux de M. de Castellane, article published in La Revue blanche no.56, 1 October 1895.
1900 Voyage, article published in le Mercure de France no.125, May 1900.
1902 Du Désir aux Destinées, Paris, Société du Mercure de France, 1902 (poems).
1904 L'Ile et l'Empire de Grande-Bretagne. Angleterre – Égypte – Inde, Paris, Société du Mercure de France, 1904.
1907 La Tragédie de Salomé, silent drama in two acts and seven tableaux, music by Florent Schmitt.
1908 Bernard Shaw, article published in Comoedia, 5 May 1908.
1911 Lettres volées – Roman d'Aujourd'hui, Paris, Librairie Félix Juven.

Some of his poems were set to music by Charles Koechlin.

References 

1868 births
1915 deaths
People from Cantal
French translators
English–French translators
Rudyard Kipling
French military personnel killed in World War I
Chevaliers of the Légion d'honneur